The Politics of Montenegro takes place in a framework of a parliamentary representative democratic republic, whereby the Prime Minister of Montenegro is the head of government, and of a multi-party system. Executive power is exercised by the government. Legislative power is vested in both the government and the Parliament of Montenegro. The Judiciary is independent of the executive and the legislature.

Constitution
The current Constitution of Montenegro was ratified and adopted by the Constitutional Parliament of Montenegro on 19 October 2007. The Constitution was officially proclaimed as the Constitution of Montenegro on 22 October 2007. This Constitution replaced the Constitution of 1992.

The new Constitution defines Montenegro as a civic, democratic and environmentally friendly country with social justice, established by the sovereign rights of its government.

|President of Montenegro
|Milo Đukanović
|Democratic Party of Socialists
|20 May 2018
|-
|Prime Minister of Montenegro
|Dritan Abazović
|United Reform Action
|28 April 2020 
|-
|President of the Parliament
|Danijela Đurović
|Socialist People's Party
|28 April 2020
|}

Executive branch
The Government of Montenegro (Влада Републике Црне Горе, Vlada Republike Crne Gore) comprises the prime minister, the deputy prime ministers as well as ministers. Dritan Abazović is the Prime Minister of Montenegro and head of the Government, since December 2022. The 43nd composition of the Government of Montenegro.

President

The President of Montenegro is elected for a period of five years through direct and secret ballots. The President:

 Represents Montenegro in the country and abroad
 Promulgates laws
 Calls for Parliamentary elections
 Proposes to the Parliament a candidate for Prime Minister, as well as for the president and justices of the Constitutional Court
 Proposes the holding of a referendum
 Grants pardons
 Confers honors and decorations

Government

The Government of Montenegro is appointed by majority vote of the Parliament. The Government:

 Formulates and conducts foreign policy
 Adopts decrees and other regulations
 Implements laws
 Concludes international treaties
 Establishes the organization and the mode of operation of the government administration
 Performs other duties as laid down in the Constitution

Prime Minister
The Prime Minister of Montenegro directs the work of the Government, and submits to the Parliament the Government's Program including a list of proposed ministers. The resignation of the Prime Minister will cause the fall of the Government.

Legislative branch

The Parliament of Montenegro (Montenegrin: Скупштина Црне Горе, Skupština Crne Gore) is the legislature of Montenegro. The Parliament currently has 81 members, each elected for a four-year term. Montenegro has a multi-party system, with numerous parties in which no one party often has a chance of gaining power alone, and parties must work with each other to form coalition governments.

The Assembly passes all laws in Montenegro, ratifies international treaties, appoints the Prime Minister, ministers, and justices of all courts, adopts the budget and performs other duties as established by the Constitution. The Parliament can pass a vote of no-confidence on the Government by a majority of the members. One deputy is elected per 6,000 voters, which in turn results in a reduction of total number of deputies in the Assembly of Montenegro.

Political parties and elections

2020 Parliamentary election

2018 Presidential elections

Recent developments 

In April 2018,  Milo Djukanovic, the leader of the ruling Democratic Party of Socialists (DPS), won Montenegro’s presidential election. The veteran politician had served as Prime Minister six times and as President once before.

In September 2020, President Milo Djukanovic’s Democratic Party of Socialists (DPS) narrowly lost the parliamentary election after having led the country for 30 years. The opposition, “For the Future of Montenegro” (ZBCG) bloc, composed mainly of Serb national parties. The new pro-serbian government was formed by Prime Minister Zdravko Krivokapic. However, Prime Minister Zdravko Krivokapic's government was toppled in no-confidence vote after only 14 months in power. In April 2022, a new minority government, comprising moderate parties that are both pro-European and pro-Serb, was formed. The new government was led by Prime Minister Dritan Abazovic.

Judicial branch
Montenegro follows the principle of division of powers. Its judicial, legislative, and executive branches are independent of each other. The judiciary is autonomous and independent. The rulings of the courts must be in accordance with the Constitution and the laws of Montenegro. Appointment to a judiciary position is permanent.

With regard to the legal profession, it is important to note that Montenegro officially became a sovereign state in 2006. According to a 2015 source, the country has approximately 800 registered attorneys and the bar association has existed for over a century. Although the Bar Association of Montenegro [Advokatska Komora Crne Gore] maintains records, there is no indication as to how demographic groups, such as women, have fared in the legal field.

Subdivisions

Montenegro is divided in 24 municipalities.

Symbols 
A new official flag of Montenegro was adopted on July 12, 2004 by the Montenegrin legislature. The new flag is based on the personal standard of King Nikola I of Montenegro. This flag was all red with a gold border, a gold coat of arms, and the initials "НИ" in Cyrillic script (corresponding to NI in Latin script) representing King Nikola I. These initials are omitted from the modern flag. The national day of 13 July marks the date in 1878 when the Congress of Berlin recognised Montenegro as the 27th independent state in the world and the start of the first popular uprising in Europe against the Axis Powers on 13 July 1941.

In 2004, the Montenegrin legislature selected a popular Montenegrin folk song, "Oh the Bright Dawn of May", as the national anthem.

References

External links
The Njegoskij Fund Public Project >> Country Profile on Montenegro